Lindsay Davenport and Mary Joe Fernández defeated the four-time defending champions Gigi Fernández and Natasha Zvereva in the final, 6–2, 6–1 to win the women's doubles tennis title at the 1996 French Open. It was Davenport's first major title; she would go on to win a further two majors in doubles and three majors in singles, eventually becoming the world No. 1 in both disciplines.

Seeds
The seeded players are listed below. Lindsay Davenport and Mary Joe Fernández are the champions; others show the round in which they were eliminated.

Draw

Finals

Top half

Section 1

Section 2

Bottom half

Section 3

Section 4

External links
 Official Results Archive (WTA)
1996 French Open – Women's draws and results at the International Tennis Federation

Women's Doubles
French Open by year – Women's doubles
French Open - Women's Doubles
1996 in French women's sport